The Secretary of State of West Virginia is an elected office within the U.S. state of West Virginia state government. The secretary of state is responsible for overseeing the state's election process, including voter registration and election results reporting.

The current Secretary of State is Republican Mac Warner.

Elections
The Office of Secretary of State is a publicly elected statewide position with elections held every four years. Elections are held in November and officers assume their duties the following January. There are no term limits for the office.

If the office of secretary of state becomes vacant, it is the duty of the governor to fill the position by appointment.  The appointee serves until a new commissioner is elected.

Qualifications for being elected to the office are that one is a citizen entitled to vote, who has been a resident of West Virginia for at least the preceding 5 years.

Duties
The West Virginia Secretary of State is the smallest constitutional office in the state - physically, fiscally, and in terms of the number of staff. The duties of the office, though, are extensive. The primary responsibility of the secretary is to serve as the chief election officer. The "work horse" of the office is the business and licensing division, which registers, licenses, and keeps a database of all businesses, corporations, charities, notary publics, private investigators, and sports agents operating within West Virginia. The secretary also files public notices of all state agency meetings, sends official documents on behalf of the governor, and certifies gubernatorial proclamations by affixing the state seal and their signature to official documents.

Organization
The Secretary of State's Office is organized as follows:

The Administrative Law Division is the official archive and clearinghouse for agency rules, notices, orders, decisions and other procedural documents.  This division publishes the state's gazette, the West Virginia Register.
The Business Organizations Division charters and maintains records for business entities and registers trademarks and service marks.  This division also licenses lending institutions and purchasers of future payments.
The Charities Division registers and regulates charitable organizations and professional fundraisers operating within the state.
The Elections Division administers elections, implements state and federal election laws, and regulates campaign finance.
The Executive Records Division maintains the records of official acts of the Governor, enrolled bills, surety bonds, oaths of office of state officials, as well as the records of some state agencies.
The Notary Public Section licenses and monitors notaries public.
The UCC Section files liens pursuant to the Uniform Commercial Code.

The Secretary of State also serves as registered agents for service of process for certain types of defendants in lawsuits.

List of West Virginia secretaries of state
Below is a list of West Virginia's secretaries of state since 1863:

*elected to fill unexpired term

See also
 List of company registers

References

External links
Official homepage of the West Virginia Secretary of State